Saltis may refer to:

Saltis, a nickname of the Stockholm Observatory
Asteroid 36614 Saltis, named after the observatory
Saltis (surname)